1859 in sports describes the year's events in world sport.

Australian rules football 

Events
 14 May — Melbourne Football Club is founded
 17 May — Australian rules football is codified 
 15 June — Castlemaine Football Club is founded 
 18 July — Geelong Football Club is founded

Baseball
National championship
 National Association of Base Ball Players champion – Brooklyn Atlantics
Events
 A group in southern Ontario adopts the New York rules in place of the Canadian rules.  The Niagara club of Buffalo, New York joins the National Association (by participating in the meeting) although it plays only locally.
 In Brooklyn, Jim Creighton moves from the local Niagara club to Star at midseason and on to Excelsior for next year, perhaps for monetary reward.

Boxing
Events
 John Morrissey announces his retirement and relinquishes the Championship of America, which is awarded to his nearest challenger John C. Heenan.
 English champion Tom Sayers defends his title twice, defeating Bill Benjamin in 11 rounds and Bob Brettle in seven.

Cricket
Events
 1 March — reorganisation of Kent County Cricket Club into the present club.
 21, 22 & 23 July — in a remarkable all-round performance, V. E. Walker of Middlesex, playing for All-England Eleven versus Surrey at The Oval, takes all ten wickets in the Surrey first innings and follows by scoring 108 in the All-England second innings, having been the not out batsman in the first with 20. He takes a further four wickets in Surrey's second innings. All-England win by 392 runs.
 7 September — departure of cricket's first-ever touring team. The team of English professionals went to North America and played five matches, winning them all. There were no first-class fixtures. A famous photograph was taken on board ship before they sailed from Liverpool (see above).  
England
 Most runs – James Grundy 530 at 17.09 (HS 67)
 Most wickets – John Jackson 83 at 11.07 (BB 8–32)

Horse racing
Events
 The Queen's Plate is initiated by the Toronto Turf Club and will be run for the first time in June 1860.  The Queen's Plate is run over 1 miles by 3-year-old thoroughbred horses foaled in Canada and is the oldest race for thoroughbreds in Canada.
England
 Grand National – Half Caste
 1,000 Guineas Stakes – 
 2,000 Guineas Stakes – The Promised Land
 The Derby – Musjid
 The Oaks – Summerside 
 St. Leger Stakes – Gamester

Lacrosse
Events
 Lacrosse is elected Canada's national sport by the Parliament of Canada.

Rowing
The Boat Race
 15 April — Oxford wins the 16th Oxford and Cambridge Boat Race
Other events
 26 July — The third Harvard–Yale Regatta (a single race) is Harvard's third win, following 1852 and 1855. Lake Quinsigamond at Worcester, Massachusetts is the third site but it will be used exclusively through 1870. The event will now be annual with occasional interruptions, primarily during major wars.

Tennis
Events
 The first game of lawn tennis is played by Major Harry Gem and his friend Augurio Perera, using a croquet lawn at 8 Ampton Road in Edgbaston, Birmingham.

References 

 
Sports by year